Parahoplitinae is an extinct subfamily of cephalopods belonging to the Ammonite family Parahoplitidae.

References 

 http://paleodb.org/cgi-bin/bridge.pl?action=checkTaxonInfo&taxon_no=84971&is_real_user=1

Ancyloceratina
Protostome subfamilies